Jamileh-Sadat Alamolhoda (born 1965), commonly known as Jamileh Alamolhoda, is an Iranian writer, scholar and lecturer who is the wife of President of Iran, Ebrahim Raisi. She holds a doctorate in education from Tarbiat Modares University and is an associate professor at the Faculty of Educational Sciences and Psychology of Shahid Beheshti University.

Career 
Alamolhoda received her doctorate in the field of philosophy of education from Tarbiat Modares University in 2001. She became a member of the faculty of the Department of Leadership and Educational Development of the School of Educational Sciences and Psychology of Shahid Beheshti University and now is an associate professor. She teaches courses such as philosophy of higher education, anthropology in Islam, teaching methods, theoretical foundations of educational management, philosophical schools and educational views in the doctoral course of Shahid Beheshti University.

Alamolhoda was the director of the Humanities Research Institute. She founded the Institute of Fundamental Studies of Science and Technology of Shahid Beheshti University in 2013 and is its director. This research institute has the task of presenting science and technology policy models based on understanding and evaluating the epistemological and social aspects of science and technology. In March 2020, she was appointed as the secretary of the "Council for the Transformation and Renovation of the Educational System of the Country" by the Supreme Council of the Cultural Revolution.

The video of Alamolhoda's speech at an international conference in which she tried to speak in English but was not fluent in it was released in the media in 2017.

Personal life 
Alamolhoda is the eldest daughter of Ahmad Alamolhoda, the Friday prayer leader in Mashhad and a member of the Assembly of Experts. In 1983 at the age of 18, she married Ebrahim Raisi. The couple has two daughters, one of whom has a PhD in sociology from the University of Tehran and the other has a BSc in physics from Sharif University of Technology.

References 

Ebrahim Raisi
1965 births
Living people
Academic staff of Shahid Beheshti University
Iranian educational theorists
20th-century Iranian women
21st-century Iranian women
Wives of presidents of Iran